Helen E. Hoens (born July 31, 1954) is a former Associate Justice of the New Jersey Supreme Court. She was nominated to the Supreme Court by Governor Jon Corzine on September 21, 2006. She was confirmed by the New Jersey Senate on October 23 and sworn into office on October 26, 2006. October 26, 2013 was her last day as a sitting member of the court.

Biography 
Born in Elizabeth, New Jersey on July 31, 1954, Hoens graduated in 1972 from Columbia High School in Maplewood and was inducted into the school's hall of fame in 2010. She holds a B.A. in government from the College of William and Mary, graduating with high honors, and a J.D. from Georgetown University Law Center. While at Georgetown, she served on the Georgetown Law Journal, first as a member of the staff and then as the editor of the journal’s annual volume devoted to developments in criminal procedure in the federal circuit courts.

Career 
Upon graduation, she served as a law clerk to Judge John Joseph Gibbons during his service on the United States Court of Appeals for the Third Circuit before embarking on a career in private practice.

After her clerkship, Hoens worked in private practice, first at Dewey Ballantine and with the Law Office of Russel H. Beatie, Jr. in New York. She moved to New Jersey to practice with Pitney, Harden and later with Lum, Hoens, Conant Danzis & Kleinberg, where her father, Charles H. Hoens Jr., was a founding partner.

Hoens was appointed to the Superior Court in 1994 by Governor Christine Todd Whitman, and reappointed by Governor Donald DiFrancesco in 2001. She was elevated to the Appellate Division in August, 2002 by Chief Justice Deborah T. Poritz.

In 2006 she was appointed to fill the anticipated vacancy on the Supreme Court left by the elevation of Associate Justice James R. Zazzali to replace Poritz as chief justice.

On August 12, 2013, Governor Chris Christie announced that he would not renominate Hoens for lifetime appointment to the state's Supreme Court.  She is the second justice of the Supreme Court to be denied tenure in more than 66 years since the adoption of the 1947 State Constitution.  Her non-reappointment is a result of the impasse between Republican Governor Chris Christie and the Democratic State Senate over the Supreme Court appointments.  Christie said he wished to spare Hoens a Senate hearing in which she would be denied reappointment.  Hoens is identified as a Republican, as is Gov. Christie.  His nominee for her replacement, Cuban-American Faustino Fernandez-Vina, is also identified as a Republican, but was approved by the State Senate .

Decisions

2008-09 Term 
 Bosland v. Warnock Dodge, Inc.
 Czar, Inc. v. Jo Anne Heath
 Riya Finnegan LLC v. Twp. Council of South Brunswick

2007-08 Term 
 Brundage v. Carambio
 Cicchetti v. Morris County Sheriff's Office
 Cruz v. Central Jersey Landscaping, Inc.
 IMO the Estate of Madeleine Stockdale
 IMO Russell T. Kivler
 In re the Contest of Nov. 8, 2005 General Election for the Office of Mayor of the Twp. of Parsippany-Troy Hills
 N.J. Society for the Prevention of Cruelty to Animals v. N.J. Department of Agriculture
 Pizullo v. N.J. Manufacturers Insurance Co.
 State v. Chun
 Reilly v. AAA Mid-Atlantic Insurance Co.
 Tartaglia v. UBS PaineWebber, Inc.

2006-07 Term 
 Carter v. Twp. of Bordentown
 In re Lead Paint Litigation
 Liguori v. Elmann
 Pascack Valley Regional High School Board of Education v. Pascack Valley Regional Support Staff Association
 Roberts v. Division of State Police
 State v. Drury
 State v. Figueroa
 Thurber v. City of Burlington

References

External links 
 Justice Helen E. Hoens

1954 births
Living people
American women lawyers
American women judges
College of William & Mary alumni
Columbia High School (New Jersey) alumni
Georgetown University Law Center alumni
Justices of the Supreme Court of New Jersey
New Jersey lawyers
New Jersey Republicans
People from Elizabeth, New Jersey
21st-century American women judges
21st-century American judges